Davit Terteryan (born 17 December 1997) is an Armenian footballer who plays as a right-back for Ararat-Armenia and the Armenia national team.

Career

Club
On 22 January 2021 Terteryan signed for FC Ararat-Armenia.

International
Terteryan made his international debut for Armenia on 1 June 2021 in a friendly match against Croatia, coming on as a substitute in the 79th minute for Artak Grigoryan. The away match finished as a 1–1 draw.

Career statistics

Club

International

References

External links
 

1997 births
Living people
Footballers from Yerevan
Armenian footballers
Armenia youth international footballers
Armenia under-21 international footballers
Armenia international footballers
Association football fullbacks
FC Pyunik players
FC Gandzasar Kapan players
FC Ararat-Armenia players
Armenian Premier League players
Armenian First League players